Brooklyn is a census-designated place (CDP) comprising the central unincorporated village in the town of Brooklyn in Windham County, Connecticut, United States. U.S. Route 6 passes through the center of the village, leading east to Danielson and west to Willimantic. As of the 2010 census, the population of the CDP was 981, out of 8,210 in the entire town of Brooklyn.

The Brooklyn Green Historic District is at the center of the village.

References 

Census-designated places in Windham County, Connecticut
Census-designated places in Connecticut